Transylvania University is a private university in Lexington, Kentucky. It was founded in 1780 and was the first university in Kentucky. It offers 46 major programs, as well as dual-degree engineering programs, and is accredited by the Southern Association of Colleges and Schools. Its medical program graduated 8,000 physicians by 1859.

Transylvania's name, meaning "across the woods" in Latin, stems from the university's founding in the heavily forested region of western Virginia known as the Transylvania Colony, which existed briefly between 1775 and 1776 in south and western Kentucky.

Transylvania is the alma mater of two U.S. vice presidents, two U.S. Supreme Court justices, 50 U.S. senators, 101 U.S. representatives, 36 U.S. governors, 34 U.S. ambassadors, and the Confederate president, making it a large producer of U.S. statesmen.

History

Transylvania was the first college west of the Allegheny Mountains and was named for the Colony of Transylvania, Latin for 'across the woods', which aimed to educate good citizens. Thomas Jefferson was governor of Virginia when the Virginia Assembly chartered Transylvania Seminary in 1780, before Kentucky was separated out as its own state. Its first sponsor was the Christ Church Cathedral's (Episcopal Church) rector, the Reverend Moore, although the school later became affiliated with the Presbyterian Church. Originally situated in a log cabin in Boyle County, Kentucky, the school moved to Lexington in 1789.  The first site in Lexington was a single building in what is now the historic Gratz Park.

By 1799, the institution was called Transylvania University. By 1818, a new main building was constructed for students' classes. That building burned down in 1829, and the school was moved to its present location north of Third Street. Old Morrison, the only campus building at the time, was constructed 1830–34, under the supervision of Henry Clay, who both taught law and was a member of Transylvania's Board. After 1818, the university included a medical school, a law school, a divinity school, and a college of arts and sciences.

An institution that aided in the development of today's Transylvania University was Bacon College of Georgetown – named after Sir Francis Bacon – which would, for a brief time, be known as Kentucky University. This school was not affiliated with the modern University of Kentucky. Founded by Disciples of Christ churches in Kentucky, Bacon College operated from 1837 to 1851. It was also distinct from nearby Georgetown College, a Disciples of Christ-supported institution. Bacon College closed due to lack of funding, but seven years later, in 1858, when the school had secured significant financial backing, Bacon College's charter was amended to establish Kentucky University, and it was moved to donated land in Harrodsburg. This school closed in 1860 and its Harrodsburg building burned in 1864. By mutual agreement and an act of the state legislature the college was merged with Transylvania University in 1865.

From these early years, Transylvania has dominated academe in the bluegrass region and was the sought-out destination for the children of the South's political leadership, military families, and business elite. It attracted many politically ambitious young men including Stephen F. Austin, the founder of Texas.

After the Civil War

Following the American Civil War,  Kentucky University was hit by a major fire, and both it and Transylvania University were left in dire financial condition. In 1865, both institutions secured permission to merge. The new institution used Transylvania's campus in Lexington while perpetuating the Kentucky University name.  The university was reorganized into several new colleges, including the Agricultural and Mechanical College (A&M) of Kentucky, publicly chartered as a department of Kentucky University as a land-grant institution under the Morrill Act.  However, due to questions regarding having a federally funded land-grant college controlled by a religious body, the A&M college was spun off in 1878 as an independent, state-run institution. The A&M of Kentucky soon developed into one of the state's flagship public universities, the University of Kentucky. Kentucky University's College of the Bible, which traced its roots to Bacon College's Department of Hebrew Literature, received a separate charter in 1878. Kentucky University's seminary eventually became a separate institution, but remained housed on the same campus until 1950. It later changed its name to the Lexington Theological Seminary. In 1903, Hamilton College, a Lexington-based women's college founded in 1869, merged into Kentucky University.

Due to confusion between Kentucky University and its daughter institution, the University of Kentucky, the institution was renamed "Transylvania University" in 1908.

1988 trademark dispute
In 1988, Transylvania University experienced an infringement on the institution's trademark when Hallmark Cards began selling "Transylvania University" T-shirts. The product, developed for the Halloween season, was intended to be a novelty item purporting to be college wear from the fictional Count Dracula's alma mater. When contacted by Transylvania University, Hallmark admitted that they were not aware of the Kentucky-based institution and recalled all unsold product immediately.

Campus
The university is located on a  urban campus about four blocks from the center of the city of Lexington, Kentucky. It has 24 buildings, 3 athletic fields, 3 dining areas, and a National Historic Landmark. The campus is divided by North Broadway: to the East stand the academic buildings of the university; to the West, most of the residential buildings.

Academic campus

The academic side of campus lies to the East of North Broadway, one of the major streets in Lexington. Old Morrison is the main administration building for the university. Designed by pioneer Kentucky architect Gideon Shryock and erected in 1833 under the supervision of Henry Clay (then professor of law at Transylvania), Old Morrison is the central image on the city seal of Lexington. It houses the offices of financial aid, accounting, the registrar, the president, the dean, communications, the Center for Academic and Professional Enrichment, and more. The building also holds the tomb of Constantine Rafinesque, professor of natural science at the university from 1819 to 1826, and Sauveur Francois Bonfils, who taught at the university from 1842 to 1849 (a native of France, he apparently was forced to flee because of political discord). During the Civil War, Old Morrison served as a hospital for Union and Confederate soldiers. It was gutted by fire in 1969 but was renovated and reopened in 1971.  It was designated a National Historic Landmark in 1965, in recognition of the university's status as the oldest west of the Allegheny Mountains.

Beside Old Morrison, the Carpenter Academic Center houses the faculties of English, philosophy, history, political science, foreign languages, and classics, as well as offices for professors. The center, formerly known as Haupt Humanities, was renovated during the 2017–2018 academic year; the renovation updated classrooms and faculty offices, added student gathering spaces, and integrated new technologies. Carpenter Academic Center was reopened in May 2018.

Behind the Carpenter Academic Center is Alumni Plaza, opened in 2015 as an outdoor classroom and social gathering area. Also on the academic side of campus, a state-of-the-art student indoor athletic facility, called the Clive M. Beck Center, was completed and opened in 2003; it is a location for men's and women's athletics and holds student fitness equipment.

The Mitchell Fine Arts Center is the home of the music program, providing offices and classrooms for both drama and music programs. It contains a large concert hall, a small theater, a recital hall, the Morlan Gallery, the music technology classroom, and the Office of Information Technology. The Morlan Gallery in the center is the location for six or seven art exhibitions every year during the academic calendar, primarily as a gallery of contemporary art, including Appalachian Folk art, Chinese art, contemporary African art, sculptural installations, and performance and video pieces. The gallery offers guided tours and lectures for school groups, civic clubs, and senior-citizen organizations.

The Cowgill Center for Business, Economics, and Education holds classrooms for these subjects and offices for professors. It features a high-tech multimedia classroom, a specialized classroom for training education majors, a computer lab, lecture halls, seminar rooms, study areas, faculty offices, and the Monroe Moosnick Medical and Science Museum. The L.A. Brown Science Center houses classrooms, laboratories and offices for the natural sciences, computer science and mathematics programs. A state-of-the-art nuclear magnetic resonance spectrometer is available to enhance students' academic and research experience.

Library

Originally completed in 1952 and dedicated by President Dwight D. Eisenhower, the main library building was renovated and enlarged in 1985; it was re-dedicated by then Vice President George H. W. Bush as the Douglas Gay Jr. and Frances Carrick Thomas Library. The Special Collections of the library houses a manuscript collection with letters, diaries, and documents of notable historical figures associated with the university including Henry Clay, Jefferson Davis, Robert Peter, John Wesley Hunt, Daniel Drake, and Horace Holley. The rare books section houses a collection of books relating to the history of horses and natural history, as well as a collection of pre-1800 medical books. The books belonging to the Transylvania Medical Department, which closed in 1859, are now kept in special collections. The library was the setting for the film "American Animals", which told how four twenty-year-old students stole and attempted to sell some of the rare books.

The basement of the library was renovated and became the Dugi Academic Center for Excellence in 2013 and the first floor was renovated in 2015.

The Glenn Building was constructed as a multi-purpose building in 2005 and houses a coffee shop, Gratz Perk, the admissions offices, and expansion space for the library. It was named in honor of James F. Glenn, a former Board of Trustees member who donated $1.1 million for its construction. It utilizes an environmentally friendly geothermal heating and air conditioning system and several mature trees near the site were preserved during construction.

Residence halls
The western half of the campus contains most of the residential parts of campus. Dalton-Voigt Hall opened in Fall 2015 and houses first-year students. This $7 million, 144-bed facility offers suite-style living and common spaces for studying and activities. Jefferson Davis Hall and Henry Clay Hall were demolished in June 2015 to make space for construction of Kincaid Hall and Bassett Hall, which are similar to Dalton-Voigt and opened in January 2017.

Thomson Hall was opened in the fall of 2008. It received Energy Star rating in 2009. It features 31 suite style living-units which include study areas, living rooms, kitchenettes, bathrooms, and bedrooms. The building is three stories tall, has  of space, and cost $5.5 million. 
Thomson Hall was built to be an environmentally friendly building and it exceeds state insulating value requirements by 28 percent. It has geothermal heating and energy, low flow shower heads, a total energy recovery wheel on outside ventilation, fifty percent recycled material in the parking lot surface, and energy saving lighting.

Dalton-Voigt, Thomson, Kincaid, and Bassett Halls all surround Back Circle, a central outdoor field where students are able to socialize, play sports, or do homework.

The other residence spaces on campus are Poole Residence Center and Rosenthal Apartment Complex. Poole houses first-year students in large, suite-style rooms. Rosenthal houses upperclass students in an outdoor apartment style.

Campus Center
The newly built and renovated William T. Young Campus Center opened in the fall of 2020. It is a 97,710-square-foot building—61,400 square feet of new construction and 36,310 square feet of renovated space. Replacing Forrer Hall, the structure offers two dining locations, an athletic workout facility, competition-sized swimming pool, and numerous meeting spaces of all sizes and uses. It also houses the health and wellness center, student life offices, and the bookstore.

The Campus Center was dedicated in October 2021 where William T. Young, Sr., whom the original Campus Center was named for, and William T. Young, Jr. were recognized for their many contributions to the university over the years. Both served time as chairman of the Board of the Trustees at Transylvania. To commemorate the contributions of the family, portraits of both Youngs adorn a wall of the new Center.

Academics

Transylvania has a selective and international admission process. Transylvania presently offers 46 majors and 37 minors and many pre-professional tracks spread among four divisions: Fine Arts, Humanities, Natural Sciences & Mathematics and Social Sciences. It offers such majors as Philosophy, Politics, and Economics (PPE) and Writing, Rhetoric, and Communication (WRC), as well as interdisciplinary studies, or the ability of students to design their own majors.

In 2018, Transylvania became the first of Kentucky's liberal arts colleges to partner with the Peace Corps to establish a Peace Corps Prep program, a diversity-oriented program designed to prepare undergraduates for international development fieldwork and potential Peace Corps service.

Transylvania also announced a partnership with Appalachian Regional Healthcare to incentivize students from Eastern Kentucky and West Virginia who are interested in healthcare, whether as a practitioner or administrator, to attend Transylvania. Students who participate will return to their home region and communities to work for ARH post-graduation.

Student life
Before beginning classes, first year students take part in an orientation week and various community building exercises including long standing traditions, such as the first-year serenade and greet line. The serenade divides the class in two for a fun sing-off. The greet line starts as a large arch made up of every member of the first-year class (and various faculty, staff and campus student leaders). Every member of the line goes down and shakes hands with all other members, introducing themselves along the way.  

There is a week-long celebration of Halloween by students known as "Raf Week" in honor of the 19th-century botanist, inventor, and Transylvania professor Constantine Rafinesque. The university ends October with a unique combination of activities including a lottery for four students to win the chance to spend the night in Rafinesque's tomb. The steps of Old Morrison are lined with pumpkins carved by students, faculty, staff, and members of the community around Halloween for what is called Pumpkinmania. In honor of Professor Rafinesque, the grab-and-go dining space in the Campus Center is named the "Rafskeller" – a pun on the word Rathskeller.

Transylvania is also known for the Kissing Tree, a white ash tree that is estimated to be nearly 280 years old – 35 years older than the university itself. In the 1940s and 1950s, the administration turned a blind eye to students kissing in public near the tree, at a time when it was frowned upon elsewhere on campus. Today, with the rules on public displays of affection slackened, students refer to the tree as the Kissing Tree. In 2003 The Chronicle of Higher Education included the Kissing Tree among the most romantic places on college campuses in America, and it was mentioned in a Wall Street Journal article about romance on college campuses.

Arts
The campus, home to several Transylvania choirs and instrumental ensembles, also hosts several exhibitions in its Morlan Gallery that change by season. The gallery focuses on work produced in the past decade from worldwide viewpoints. Transylvania was honored with an international Gold Award for Transylvania Treasures, its publication dedicated to showcasing the rare and valuable items in Transylvania University's special collections and medical and science museum, and now is considered a treasure in its own right, concluding a prestigious national competition sponsored by the Council for Advancement and Support of Education. Transylvania's theatre department produces two to three stage productions every year. The Lucille C. Little Theater provides a performance space for theatre performances by students and professionals on campus.

Fraternities and sororities
Transylvania has Greek life on campus, with four fraternities and four sororities and 42% of the students as members of Greek organizations. In its 2022 edition of "The Best 387 Colleges", the Princeton Review named Transylvania in the top 10 U.S. schools on its list of colleges with "Lots of Greek Life". In 2010, the school was ranked first in percentage of Greek students on campus.

Fraternities
 Delta Sigma Phi – Beta Mu Chapter, founded in 1941
 Kappa Alpha Order – Alpha Theta Chapter, founded in 1891
 Phi Kappa Tau – Theta Chapter, founded in 1917
 Pi Kappa Alpha – Kappa Chapter, founded in 1868
 Kappa Sigma – Alpha Omicron, founded September 7, 1894 (dormant)
 Phi Kappa Psi – Kentucky Alpha Chapter founded in 1865 (closed 1866)
 Beta Theta Pi – Epsilon Chapter, founded in 1842 (closed 1847)

Sororities
 Alpha Omicron Pi – Tau Omega Chapter, founded in 1987
 Chi Omega – Chi Chapter, founded in 1903
 Delta Delta Delta – Beta Zeta Chapter, founded in 1908
 Phi Mu – Delta Theta Chapter, founded in 1939
 Alpha Delta Theta - Alpha Chapter, founded in 1919 (merged with Phi Mu 1939)
 Delta Zeta – founded in 1954 (closed)
 Sigma Kappa – founded in 1966 (closed 1984)

Athletics
Transylvania athletic teams are the Pioneers. The university is a member of the Division III level of the National Collegiate Athletic Association (NCAA), primarily competing in the Heartland Collegiate Athletic Conference (HCAC) since the 2001–02 academic year. The Pioneers previously competed in the Kentucky Intercollegiate Athletic Conference (KIAC; now currently known as the River States Conference (RSC) since the 2016–17 school year) of the National Association of Intercollegiate Athletics (NAIA) from 1916–17 to 2000–01.

Transylvania competes in 27 intercollegiate varsity sports: Men's sports include baseball, basketball, cross country, golf, lacrosse, soccer, swimming & diving, tennis and track & field; women's sports include basketball, cross country, field hockey, golf, lacrosse, soccer, softball, swimming & diving, tennis, track & field, triathlon and volleyball; and co-ed teams include cheerleading, dance and equestrian (eventing).

The Transylvania Pioneers student-athletes compete under colors crimson and white at a variety of venues throughout the country; maintain successful results; and often compete against larger institutions including Ohio University.

Philanthropists have increased sizable gifts to the university in its present period more so than ever before, and coaches at Transylvania University have been continually recognized for athletic achievements.

Football 

Transylvania won the first recorded football game in the state of Kentucky by defeating the Centre Praying Colonels of Centre College  13–0. Its 1903 team claimed a southern championship.  The Pioneers played football from 1888 to 1941 (except 1906), when the team disbanded.

Notable people
Amongst Transylvania's prominent alumni are two U.S. vice presidents, John C. Breckinridge and Richard Mentor Johnson, and two U.S. Supreme Court justices, John Marshall Harlan and Samuel Freeman Miller.

Notable alumni
Hugh Toland, surgeon, founder of the University of California, San Francisco (UCSF)
George Shannon, member of the Lewis and Clark Expedition
Matthew Harris Jouett, artist, enrolled in 1804
William T. Barry, seventh United States Postmaster General, Secretary of State of Kentucky, Lieutenant Governor of Kentucky, U.S. House of Representatives from Kentucky
James G. Birney, abolitionist, politician and jurist, served in the Kentucky House of Representatives
Richard Mentor Johnson, Vice President of the United States
Stephen F. Austin, founder of Texas, left without graduating in 1810. Secured a certificate stating that he had "conducted himself in a exemplary & praiseworthy manner" according to Gregg Cantrell's biography
William A. Trimble, U.S. Senator, graduated 1810 
Francis Preston Blair, politician and editor of the Washington Globe, graduated 1811
William Orlando Butler, U.S. Representative and U.S. Army major general from Kentucky
Alexander Campbell, Senator from Ohio
David Grant Colson, U.S. Representative from Kentucky
Charles S. Morehead, U.S. Representative from Kentucky and Governor of Kentucky, graduated 1820
Jefferson Davis, President of the Confederate States of America; transferred to West Point in 1823
Jesse D. Bright, U.S. senator
Solomon W. Downs, U.S. Senator, graduated 1823
Edward A. Hannegan, U.S. Representative and Senator
Albert Sidney Johnston, Confederate General
David Rice Atchison, U.S. Senator from Missouri, graduated 1825
Landaff Andrews, United States Representative from Kentucky, graduate 1826
John Calvin McCoy, founder of Kansas City, Missouri, studied 1826–1827
William M. Gwin, U.S. Senator, graduated with medical degree in 1828
George W. Johnson, Confederate "governor" of Kentucky and Kentucky State Representative, received three degrees from Transylvania University: an A.B. in 1829, an LL.B. in 1832, and an M.A. in 1833
Levi Boone, mayor of Chicago, graduated from medical school 1829
Stevens T. Mason (1811–1843), Governor of Michigan 1835–1840, attended circa 1830
Wilson Shannon, 14th and 16th Governor of Ohio
Cassius Marcellus Clay, abolitionist, state legislator, and ambassador to Russia, graduated in 1831
William Alexander Richardson (1811–1875), U.S. Senator from Illinois, graduated 1831
James Speed, Attorney General under Abraham Lincoln, graduated 1833
Thomas Burton Hanly, Arkansas state legislator and judge, CSA Congressman, graduated 1834
James S. Rollins, Missouri politician, "Father of the University of Missouri", graduated 1834
Jerome B. Robertson, Confederate General, Texas politician, graduated 1835
Samuel Freeman Miller, Associate Justice, United States Supreme Court; graduated with medical degree in 1838
Beriah Magoffin, Governor of Kentucky, earned law degree in 1838
Francis Preston Blair, Jr., soldier and Missouri representative in the House of Representatives and the Senate, studied law in 1841
Malcolm D. Graham, US Congressman, CSA Congressman, Texas State Senate, Texas Attorney General, Colonel in Confederate States Army
John C. Breckinridge, Vice President, United States; Secretary of War, Confederate States of America, graduated 1841
Ethelbert Ludlow Dudley, prominent physician and Union military commander in Civil War,  graduated in 1842 and joined the staff of the Medical School
Thomas James Churchill, Confederate major general during the American Civil War and the 13th Governor of the state of Arkansas, studied law at Transylvania University at some time between 1844 and 1846.
B. Gratz Brown, 20th Governor of Missouri, graduated 1845
Joseph O. Shelby, Confederate major general during the American Civil War, graduated 1850
John Marshall Harlan, U.S. Supreme Court Justice, graduated in 1853, and was first justice to have earned a modern law degree.
George Graham Vest, U.S. Senator from Missouri, Confederate, US Congressman, Senator, and prominent lawyer, graduated in 1853.
General Basil Duke, graduated the school of law in 1858. Later married Henrietta Morgan, sister of John Hunt Morgan, in 1861. Basil became a lieutenant in Morgan's Second Kentucky Cavalry. After Morgan's death, he was promoted to brigade commander. He later practiced law in Louisville, Kentucky and served as counsel for the Louisville and Nashville Railroad. He was elected to the state legislature in 1869
John Breckinridge Castleman, Confederate officer who later rose to rank of Brigadier General in US Army, studied law there immediately before the outbreak of the Civil War
Edward A. Eckenhoff, President and CEO National Rehabilitation Hospital, Washington, DC
John E. Fryer, American psychiatrist and gay rights activist best known for his anonymous speech at the 1972 American Psychiatric Association (APA) annual conference where he appeared in disguise and under the name "Dr. Henry Anonymous". This event has been cited as a key factor in the decision to de-list homosexuality as a mental illness from the APA's Diagnostic and Statistical Manual of Mental Disorders. 
Richard Montgomery Gano, Confederate General
Teresa Isaac, mayor of Lexington, Kentucky 2002–2006
George Wallace Jones, U.S. senator, U.S. representative, and ambassador
Matt Jones, radio host, attorney, and founder of Kentucky Sports Radio
Matthew Harris Jouett, painter known for portraits of figures including Thomas Jefferson
Trey Kramer, Professional soccer and football player
Daniel Mongiardo, Lieutenant Governor of Kentucky
Arthur D. Nicholson, United States Army officer shot and killed by a Soviet sentry in 1985, while conducting intelligence activities in East Germany
Steve Nunn, former member of the Kentucky House of Representatives
William Lindsay Pogue, attorney, Amanda iron furnace owner, developer of 80,000 acres of Pogue/Poage lands in Northeastern Kentucky
Charles Lynn Pyatt, dean, Lexington Theological Seminary
Clyde Roper, zoologist
Lee Rose, basketball coach
Kyle Smith, Professional soccer player
Karen K. Caldwell, Chief United States District Judge for the United States District Court for the Eastern District of Kentucky
Albert Benjamin "Happy" Chandler, Sr. Major League Baseball commissioner, Governor of Kentucky, and Senator from Kentucky
Cy Barger, major league baseball player
Eugene C. Barker, historian; wrote The Life of Stephen F. Austin (1925); received LL.D. from Transylvania in 1940
Ned Beatty, actor
James Lane Allen, author
George B. Kinkead, Kentucky Secretary of State (1846-1847)
Gil Rogers, actor
Claria Horn Boom, District Judge of the United States District Court for the Eastern District of Kentucky and United States District Court for the Western District of Kentucky

Notable faculty

 Henry Bidleman Bascom (1796–1850) – U.S. Congressional Chaplain, Methodist Bishop, President of Transylvania University 1842–1849.
 Robert Hamilton Bishop, first president of Miami University in Oxford, Ohio
 Henry Clay, seminal law department professor
 Charles Caldwell, physician and founder of the University of Louisville School of Medicine
 Daniel Drake, taught materia medica from 1817 to 1818, dean from 1825 to 1827
 Maurice Manning, poet
 Charles Martin "C. M." Newton, TU basketball coach, 1956–68
 Constantine Samuel Rafinesque, professor of botany, buried on campus
 Charles Wilkins Short, American botanist
 Elisha Warfield, doctor and noted horse breeder, selected as the first Professor of Surgery and Obstetrics at the (then-) newly established medical school at Transylvania University

In popular culture
Robert Penn Warren set part of his 1946 novel All the King's Men at Transylvania University. 
Robert Lowell referred to the university in his sonnet "The Graduate (Elizabeth)." The poem states gleefully that "Transylvania's Greek Revival Chapel is one of the best Greek Revival things in the South."
A 2004 robbery at Transylvania University's special collections library was the subject of the true-crime drama film American Animals, released in 2018. It was also the focus of Episode 3 of the Audible podcast "Heist with Michael Caine," as well as a memoir written by one of the culprits involved in the heist titled Mr. Pink: The Inside Story of the Transylvania Book Heist.
Transylvania is home to the Judy Gaines Young Book Award, given annually to honor an excellent work of fiction or poetry written in the Appalachian region in the prior two to three years.

See also 

List of presidents of Transylvania University
Transylvania (colony)
Judy Gaines Young Book Award

References
Notes

Further reading
 Cousins, James P. Horace Holley: Transylvania University and the Making of Liberal Education in the Early American Republic (U Press of Kentucky, 2016). 297 pp
 
 Peter, Robert. The history of the medical department of Transylvania University (1905) online.
 Peter, Robert, and Johanna Peter. Transylvania University: Its Origin, Rise, Decline, and Fall (1896) online
 Sonne, Niels Henry. Liberal Kentucky, 1780–1828 (University of Kentucky Press, 1968)
 Wright, John, Jr., ed. Transylvania: Tutor to the West (2nd ed. 1980)

External links

 
 Official athletics website

 
Educational institutions established in 1780
1780 establishments in Virginia
Universities and colleges affiliated with the Christian Church (Disciples of Christ)
Universities and colleges accredited by the Southern Association of Colleges and Schools
Universities and colleges in Lexington, Kentucky
Liberal arts colleges in Kentucky
National Register of Historic Places in Lexington, Kentucky
National Historic Landmarks in Kentucky
University and college buildings on the National Register of Historic Places in Kentucky
Private universities and colleges in Kentucky